Hiodontiformes  is an order of ray-finned fish consisting of the two living species of the mooneye family, Hiodontidae, and three extinct genera.  

These are traditionally classified within the order Osteoglossiformes, a placement some authorities still follow. Fossil study of the extinct genus Yanbiania suggests that the hiodontids separated from other osteoglossomorphs early and thus may deserve a separate order.

Taxonomy
 Order Hiodontiformes McAllister 1968 sensu Taverne 1979
 Genus †Chetungichthys Chang & Chou 1977
 †Chetungichthys brevicephalus Chang & Chou 1977
 †Chetungichthys dalinghensis Su 1991
 Genus †Yanbiania Li 1987
 †Yanbiania wangqingica Li 1987
 Genus †Plesiolycoptera Zhang & Zhou 1976
 †Plesiolycoptera daqingensis Zhang & Zhou 1976
 †Plesiolycoptera parvus ((Sytchevskaya, 1986) (syn Eohiodon (Gobihiodon) parvus Sytchevskaya, 1986)
 Family Hiodontidae (mooneyes) Valenciennes 1846 sensu stricto
 Genus Hiodon Lesueur 1818 [(syn: Amphiodon Rafinesque 1819 non Huber 1909; Hiodon (Amphiodon) (Rafinesque 1819); Hiodon (Clodalus) Rafinesque 1820; Clodalus (Rafinesque 1820); Hiodon (Elattonistius) Gill & Jordan ex Jordan 1877; Elattonistius (Gill & Jordan ex Jordan 1877); Glossodon Rafinesque 1818 non Heckel 1843; Eohiodon Cavender 1966)
 Hiodon alosoides (goldeye) (Rafinesque 1819)
 †Hiodon consteniorum Li & Wilson 1994 
 †Hiodon falcatus (Grande, 1979) (syn Eohiodon falcatus (Grande, 1979))
 †Hiodon rosei (Hussakof 1916) (syn Eohiodon rosei (Hussakof 1916); Leucisus rosei Hussakof, 1916)
 Hiodon tergisus (mooneye) Lesueur 1818
 †Hiodon woodruffi Wilson, 1978
 †Hiodon shuyangensis Shen 1989 (nom dubium, possibly an immature Phareodus)

References

External links
 Tree of Life entry for Hiodontiformes

 
Ray-finned fish orders